John Palmer Parker (May 1, 1790 – August 20, 1868) was the founder of the Parker Ranch on the island of Hawaii in Hawaii. In 2008, he was inducted into the Hall of Great Westerners of the National Cowboy & Western Heritage Museum.

Life
John Palmer Parker was born May 1, 1790, in Newton, Massachusetts. His father was Samuel Parker (1742–1822) and mother was Ann Palmer Parker (1753–1841).

Parker arrived in Hawaii around 1809 by jumping off of a ship. John Parker came to the attention of King Kamehameha I, the chief who united the eight separate islands into the Kingdom of Hawaii, and was given important tasks by the king. John traveled to China during the War of 1812, returning to Hawaii in 1815. Having brought back with him a new, state-of-the-art American musket, Parker was given the privilege of being the first man paid to shoot some of the thousands of feral cattle that roamed Hawaii’s remote plains and valleys. These animals were the descendants of one bull and five cows given by British Captain George Vancouver to Kamehameha as a gift in 1793.

A year after he returned to Hawaii in 1815, he married Chiefess Kipikane (1800–1860), full name Keli'ikipikaneokaolohaka, the granddaughter of Kamehameha I and daughter of Kahiwa Kanekapolei. Kipikane took the Christian name Rachel. She bore John a daughter Mary Ann Kaulalani (1819–1859) and two sons Ebenezer (1829–1855) and John Palmer Kamaikaaloa Kalanioku (1827–1900). The Parker dynasty figured in the next two centuries of Hawaiian history. The family first settled at a small farm in the Kohala district. In 1835 he was hired by Honolulu merchant William French to start a commercial operation selling products of the wild cattle near the present town of Waimea. With his New England education, Parker became accountant of French's business and managed a store called Puuloa.

Beef from these cattle was salted and sold to whaling vessels. Live cattle were driven down to the harbor at Kawaihae and shipped to Honolulu.  Meat, animal products, and hides were shipped to South America and the United States.  Salted beef eventually replaced the increasingly scarce sandalwood as the island’s chief export. On January 8, 1847, Parker acquired some land in the remote uplands of Mauna Kea at about  elevation at  called Mānā.
Mānā means "arid" in the Hawaiian language.

The first Parker homestead was a small cottage called Hale Mānā ('Dry House') at this site. After the Great Mahele allowed private land ownership, he purchased  around Mānā in 1850 and another thousand acres in 1851. More land was leased from King Kamehameha III, and the ranch continued to grow. Over time Parker switched from hunting wild animals to domesticating and raising them in fenced paddocks.

His son John Palmer II married Hawaiian Hanai on October 6, 1845, and then after her death, Leiakaula on January 3, 1865. Ebenezer married Kilia June 7, 1849.

Parker also developed orchards and a dairy operation. Despite the death of his son Ebenezer in 1855 and a drought in 1856, he added yet more land in the area known as Paauhau by 1861.
After his first wife Kipikane died, he married another Hawaiian woman named Leiakaula. His health began to fail in 1867. Parker died August 20, 1868 on Oahu and was buried back at the family cemetery near Hale Mānā.
He was inducted into the Hall of Great Westerners at the National Cowboy & Western Heritage Museum in 2008.
The ranch would be inherited by John Palmer II and Ebenezer's son Samuel Parker (only 15 years old at the time). John Palmer II took over operation of the ranch, although he was appointed to the upper House of Nobles in the legislature of the Hawaiian Kingdom in 1873. Grandson Samuel became more active in politics, so after John II's death Alfred Wellington Carter became ranch manager.

Family tree

References

1790 births
1868 deaths
People from Newton, Massachusetts
Hawaii (island)
Ranchers from Hawaii